Asa Beebe Cross (December 9, 1826 in New Jersey - August 18, 1894) was an American architect. He studied architecture under Thomas Walsh and John Johnson. He primarily worked in Kansas City where it is estimated that he designed more than 1,000 structures. He designed Union Depot in Kansas City (opened 1878), Seth E. Ward Homestead for Seth Ward, Old Jackson County Courthouse in Kansas City, Missouri, and the Vaile Mansion. He designed many homes in Quality Hill. His grandson Alfred E. Barnes was also an architect.

Work
Wornall House, 146 W. 61st St. Kansas City, MO Cross, Asa Beebe 
Seth E. Ward Homestead, 1032 W. 55th St. Kansas City, MO Cross, Asa Beebe 
Union Depot (Kansas City, Missouri) (built in 1878, predecessor to Kansas City Union Station)
Jackson County Courthouse, also known as the Truman Courthouse, completed 1936
Vaughan's Diamond Building, 9th and Delaware, completed 1870
Sauer Castle, 935 Shawnee Rd. Kansas City, KS, believed to be a Cross design, 1971
Vaile Mansion, 1500 N Liberty St, Independence, MO, completed 1881
Gillis Opera House, 5th and Walnut, completed 1883
St. Patrick's Catholic Church, 8th and Cherry

References

Architects from Missouri

1826 births
1894 deaths